Hope A. Ishii is an American scientist and the Director of the Advanced Electron Microscopy Center at the Hawai'i Institute of Geophysics and Planetology (HIGP) at the University of Hawai'i. Her work focuses on analysis and characterization of small solar system objects such as comet and asteroid dust, primarily by means of electron microscopy and x-ray spectroscopy, sometime from samples collected in space using aerogel.
She is a research faculty member at the University of Hawaiʻi at Mānoa, and an affiliate researcher at Lawrence Berkeley National Laboratory.

Education 
Ishii received her Ph.D from Stanford University in 2002, working on the characterization of amorphous Molybdenum-Germanium alloy by anomalous x-ray scattering; her MS in Physics and Engineering from  Chalmers University of Technology, 1995 and her BS in Material Science and Engineering from Cornell University in 1994.

References

External links 

Cornell University alumni
Chalmers University of Technology alumni
Stanford University alumni
Year of birth missing (living people)
Living people
Women physicists
American women scientists
21st-century American women